Lauerman Brothers Department Store was a department store chain in the early 20th century. Its flagship store in Marinette, Wisconsin is a registered historic place. The chain consisted of 13 stores in Wisconsin, Michigan, and Iowa.

References

External links
Lauerman Family

Buildings and structures in Marinette County, Wisconsin
Commercial buildings on the National Register of Historic Places in Wisconsin
Department stores on the National Register of Historic Places
National Register of Historic Places in Marinette County, Wisconsin